Karim Mohamed El Debes (born 3 June 2003) is an Egyptian professional footballer who plays as a winger for Wadi Degla.

Club career
Born in Shibin El Qanater, El Debes began his career with the local side by the same name, before joining Al Mokawloon, where he spent five years. He joined Wadi Degla in 2018, being promoted to the first team squad in 2020. After impressive performances for Wadi Degla, despite the side being relegated to the Egyptian Second Division, he trialled with Belgian side K.V. Kortrijk, Italian side Udinese and Greek side Olympiacos.

On 22 September 2022, El Debes' agent stated that he would move to Egyptian Premier League champions Al Ahly. El Debes confirmed this himself only four day later. He announced his departure from Wadi Degla via Instagram on 3 October 2022, by which point Zamalek had also been touted as a potential new club for El Debes.

The move to Al Ahly was completed in October 2022, with El Debes scoring on his debut for the youth team in a 3–0 win against Petrojet. In January 2023, El Debes trained with the Al Ahly first team for the first time, with both Al Ittihad Alexandria and National Bank of Egypt looking to secure a loan deal for the winger.

International career
El Debes represented Egypt's under-20 side at their unsuccessful 2023 U-20 Africa Cup of Nations campaign, in which they were knocked out in the group stage, only collecting one point for a 0–0 draw with Mozambique.

Career statistics

Club

Notes

References

2003 births
Living people
People from Qalyubiyya Governorate
Egyptian footballers
Egypt youth international footballers
Association football wingers
Egyptian Premier League players
Egyptian Second Division players
Al Mokawloon Al Arab SC players
Wadi Degla SC players
Al Ahly SC players